Darren Watson (born 10 August 2003) is a Scottish professional footballer who plays as a forward for Forfar Athletic, on loan from Scottish Premiership club Dundee United.

Early life
Watson was born in Scotland on 10 August 2003, he attended Methilhill Primary School, Methilhill, Fife before switching to St Johns Academy and was given a contract at Dundee United.

Club career
Watson began his career playing youth football for Kennoway FC and at the Fife Elite Football Academy. He joined the youth academy of Dundee United in 2015, signing his first professional contract in May 2019. Watson made his debut for the club against Rangers in the Scottish Premiership on 13 December 2020. He started the game on the bench, coming on as a substitute for Adrián Spörle in the 86th minute of the game, as the match ended in a 2–1 defeat for Dundee United.

On 28 January 2022, Watson joined Scottish League One side East Fife on loan for the remainder of the 2021–22 season. Darren returned to his parent club Dundee United due to a injury that cut short his loan stay at the Methil outfits.

International career
Watson has represented Scotland at under-16. He played his first match against Australia U16 on 24 January 2019, as a half time substitute for Aaron Lyall. The match ended 3–2 in favour of Scotland.

Career statistics

References

External links
 Darren Watson at Dundee United FC
 
 
 
 Darren Watson at Sofascore
 
 

Living people
2003 births
Scottish footballers
Association football forwards
Dundee United F.C. players
East Fife F.C. players
Scottish Professional Football League players
Scotland youth international footballers
Forfar Athletic F.C. players